Mount Daimler is one of the highest points of the rock massif of Trakiya Heights between Russell East Glacier and Victory Glacier, situated 3.87 km east-southeast of Irakli Peak and  south of Mount Canicula, Trinity Peninsula. It was mapped from surveys by the Falkland Islands Dependencies Survey (1960–61), and named by the UK Antarctic Place-Names Committee for Gottlieb Daimler, a German engineer who developed the light-oil medium speed internal combustion engine which made possible the first commercial production of light mechanical land transport, 1883–85.

Map
 Trinity Peninsula. Scale 1:250000 topographic map No. 5697. Institut für Angewandte Geodäsie and British Antarctic Survey, 1996.

References 

 SCAR Composite Antarctic Gazetteer.

Mountains of Trinity Peninsula